George Kracum (January 24, 1918 – June 7, 1981) was an American football fullback. He played for the Brooklyn Dodgers in 1941.

References

1918 births
1981 deaths
People from Carbon County, Pennsylvania
Players of American football from Pennsylvania
American football fullbacks
Pittsburgh Panthers football players
Brooklyn Dodgers (NFL) players